Miss America 1986, the 59th Miss America pageant, took place at the Boardwalk Hall in Atlantic City, New Jersey on September 14, 1985 and was broadcast on NBC Network.

Results

Order of announcements

Top 10

Awards

Preliminary awards

Non-finalist awards

Delegates

Judges
 Marian McKnight
 Chris Schenkel
 Jerome Hines
 Georgia Gibbs
 Gilbert Mitchell
 John Zerbe
 Cicely Tyson

References

External links
 Miss America official website

1986
1985 in the United States
1986 beauty pageants
1985 in New Jersey
September 1985 events in the United States
Events in Atlantic City, New Jersey